Liga Nacional de Fútbol Americano (LNFA) is the name of the top gridiron league which operates in Spain. It was first founded in 1988 and reorganized in 1995 after the merge of several previous Spanish competitions.

The league is run by the Spanish Federation of American Football (Federación Española de Futbol Americano (FEFA) in Spanish language).

At the end of the season, league champion and runner up clinch bids to compete at next year's European Football League, while third and fourth teams classify for the EFAF Cup.

There has been changes in the number of teams throughout the years. Since 2015, teams are divided into three categories: Serie A, with the top six teams, second tier Serie B with ten teams competing in two conferences, and Serie C, with regional and interregional leagues.

History

LNFA Bowl results

LNFA Bowl appearances

LNFA Serie B
The Serie B is the second division of the LNFA. It was created in 2012 and named originally as LNFA while the top league was called LNFA Elite. In 2014, it changed the name to Serie B.

LNFA Serie C
The Serie C is the third division of the LNFA. It was created in 2015 with the aim to get more teams in the national leagues.

See also 
Spain's american football cup
LNFA 2

External links 
Spanish Federation of American Football
Agrupación Española de Fútbol Americano
Historia de la competición en España
European Federation of American Football
International Federation of American Football
Historical LNFA game results

 

 
Amer
Spa
1995 establishments in Spain
Sports leagues established in 1995